Irvin Raúl Parra (born August 18, 1993) is an American professional soccer player who currently plays as a forward for Northern Colorado Hailstorm in USL League One..

Career

FC 08 Homburg
Parra signed his first professional contract with FC 08 Homburg and played in their 2011–12 season. During Parra's time with Homburg he appeared in three matches. On August 31, 2012, it was reported that Parra was banned for disciplinary reasons from the team.

SVN Zweibrücken
With SVN Zweibrücken, Parra made 30 appearances with twenty-two goals in his one season with the team.

1. FC Kaiserslautern II
On May 29, 2014, it was announced that Parra had signed with Kaiserslautern II. On June 29, 2016, reports came out that Parra was no longer training with the team and on July 1 Parra was considered a free agent. Over his two seasons with Kaiserslautern II, Parra appeared in 27 matches and scored twenty-three goals.

Seattle Sounders FC 2
Parra signed with the Sounders S2 on August 4, midway through the 2016 season, after becoming a free agent at the conclusion of 1. FC Kaiserslautern II's 2015–2016 season. On August 20, Parra appeared in his first match which resulted in a 1–0 defeat against San Antonio FC. On September 2, Parra scored his first goal in a 2–1 victory against Vancouver Whitecaps FC 2.

Las Vegas Lights
On January 9, 2019, Parra signed for USL Championship side Las Vegas Lights.

San Diego Loyal
On December 20, 2019, it was announced that Parra would join San Diego Loyal SC ahead of their inaugural USL Championship season in 2020.

Charlotte Independence
On April 19, 2021, Parra joined Charlotte Independence ahead of the 2021 USL Championship season.

Northern Colorado Hailstorm
On January 13, 2022, Parra joined USL League One expansion side Northern Colorado Hailstorm FC.

References

External links
Sounders FC 2 player bio

1993 births
Living people
American soccer players
American expatriate soccer players
FC 08 Homburg players
SVN Zweibrücken players
1. FC Kaiserslautern II players
Tacoma Defiance players
Orange County SC players
Las Vegas Lights FC players
San Diego Loyal SC players
Charlotte Independence players
Association football midfielders
Soccer players from California
Sportspeople from Inglewood, California
American expatriate soccer players in Germany
USL Championship players